Nailsea & Tickenham Football Club is a football club based in Nailsea, England.

History
In 2015, Nailsea & Tickenham were formed following a merger between Somerset County League side Nailsea Town and Weston Super Mare & District League club Tickenham United. The new club took Nailsea Town's place in the Somerset County League, finishing runners-up in their first season. In 2022, the club was admitted into the Western League Division One.

Ground
The club currently play at Fryth Way, Nailsea.

References

Nailsea
Association football clubs established in 2015
2015 establishments in England
Football clubs in England
Football clubs in Somerset
Somerset County League
Western Football League